Nevenka Puškarević (born 30 April 1952) is a Yugoslav gymnast. She competed at the 1972 Summer Olympics.

References

External links
 

1952 births
Living people
Yugoslav female artistic gymnasts
Olympic gymnasts of Yugoslavia
Gymnasts at the 1972 Summer Olympics
Place of birth missing (living people)